William Moore (May 18, 1837–February 16, 1918) was a United States Navy Medal of Honor recipient.

Biography
Born in Boston, Massachusetts, he received the Medal of Honor, for heroism, on December 27, 1862, while on the Yazoo River Expedition, Mississippi, during the American Civil War.

He is buried in Austin, Texas.

Medal of Honor citation

Rank and Organization:
Boatswain's Mate, U.S. Navy. Born: 1834, Boston, Massachusetts. Accredited to: Massachusetts. G.O. No.: 32, April 16, 1864.

Citation:
Serving as boatswain's mate on board the U.S.S. Benton during the attack on Haines Bluff, Yazoo River, 27 December 1862. Wounded during the hour and a half engagement in which the enemy had the dead range of the vessel and was punishing her with heavy fire, Moore served courageously in carrying lines to the shore until the Benton was ordered to withdraw.Medal of Honor recipients: Civil War (M-Z): Moore, William - United States Army Center of Military History - Retrieved on 2007-11-08

See also

List of American Civil War Medal of Honor recipients: M–P

References

1837 births
1918 deaths
Union Navy sailors
United States Navy Medal of Honor recipients
United States Navy sailors
People from Boston
American Civil War recipients of the Medal of Honor